Danil Anisimov (born 23 May 1978) is a Kazakhstani alpine skier. He competed in two events at the 2002 Winter Olympics.

Career

References

1978 births
Living people
Kazakhstani male alpine skiers
Olympic alpine skiers of Kazakhstan
Alpine skiers at the 2002 Winter Olympics
Sportspeople from Oskemen
Alpine skiers at the 1999 Asian Winter Games